Chongqing Juvenile Offender Detachment is a prison in the municipality of Chongqing, China.

The prison was established in 1954.

See also
List of prisons in Chongqing municipality

References

1954 establishments in China
Buildings and structures completed in 1954
Prisons in Chongqing
Youth detention centers